Ischadium is a monotypic genus of mussels in the family Mytilidae. The sole species is Ischadium recurvum, known as the "Hooked mussel" or "Bent mussel". It can be found along the Atlantic coast of North America, ranging from Cape Cod to the West Indies. They are often found growing on Eastern oysters, either intertidal (south of Chesapeake Bay, where the exposed oysters can survive the winter) or subtidal. They also attach to other hard substrates, including artificial reefs and dead shells of brackish water clams, Rangia cuneata.

Predation 
Ischadium detects predators primarily through the use of scent, the scent of the predator or the scent of nearby dead bivalves. Hooked mussels’ primary predators include the blue crab, Callinectes sapidus. Ischadium recurvum grows on Crassostrea virginica reefs. These reefs appear off the coast of the Gulf of Mexico. They tend to appear in estuarine conditions in the Gulf.Ischadium is a choice prey item due to its richness of macronutrients. It contains large amounts of crude proteins, lipids, ash, and gross energy regardless of season in comparison to other mussels such as M. lateralis. It also contains more magnesium, iron, zinc, copper, and manganese than other comparable mussels. The nutritional value of these mussels make them valuable to predators.

Strategies to Avoid Predation 
Being a good prey item, Ischadium must build its defenses in order to protect itself, It does this by creating a harder shell. Shell strength, the amount of force it takes to crack the shell, increases as the length of the mussel increases. These mussels tend to be more successful in clumps than as individuals. Due to the increased difficulty of predators obtaining them. In clumps the mussels are not only harder to reach, but also they are harder to detach from these clumps. In order for the mussels to defend themselves from predators, they create byssal threads. Byssal threads are threads that connect them to their substrate. By creating more byssal threads the mussel is harder to remove from their spot. Because larger mussels produce a greater amount of byssal threads, smaller mussels tend to be the targets of prey like the blue crab. While the smaller mussels spend a greater fraction energy to produce byssal threads they still tend to be targeted by predators due to their smaller size and surface area. The more byssal threads produced the stronger its attachment to its substrate making it harder to be taken by predators.

Habitat 
Ischadium recurvum prefers to feed in environments with a lower salinity. As salinity increased rates of clearance, filtration, organic ingestion, and absorption rates decreased. High salinity values are stressful for this species of bivalves and make their feeding habits inefficient. Due to Ischadium recurvum’s dependency upon oyster beds its survivability depends directly on the oyster’s survivability. In regions such as the Chesapeake bay, where disease and over-harvesting have caused a decline in the oyster population, there has been a corresponding loss in the hooked mussel population. While Ischadium can attach on to other hard substrates the decline in the oyster population also causes increases in sedimentation rates, which causes the loss of substrate available to Ischadium. This makes the population of Ischadium extremely susceptible to changes is the oyster population.

References 

Mytilidae
Bivalve genera
Monotypic mollusc genera